The  École nationale des sciences appliquées d'El Jadida (المدرسة الوطنية للعلوم التطبيقية بالجديدة) is a Moroccan public engineering school located in El Jadida attached to the Chouaïb Doukkali University, and part of the national network of appliedscience schools. It is a public institution whose mission is to train engineers with specializations in;

Computer engineering and emerging technology
Telecommunication and Networks engineering
Power and energy engineering

External links
 Site officiel de l'ENSA d'EL Jadida

Education in Morocco
Engineering universities and colleges